Diplasterias is a genus of starfish in the family Asteriidae.

Species
The World Register of Marine Species lists the following species:

 Diplasterias brandti (Bell, 1881)
 Diplasterias brucei (Koehler, 1908)
 Diplasterias kerguelenensis (Koehler, 1917)
 Diplasterias meridionalis (Perrier, 1875)
 Diplasterias octoradiata (Studer, 1885)
 Diplasterias radiata (Koehler, 1923)
 Diplasterias spinosa Perrier, 1881

References

Asteriidae
Taxa named by Edmond Perrier